Bento de Abreu is a municipality near Araçatuba in the state of São Paulo in Brazil. The population is 3,005 (2020 est.) in an area of 302 km². The elevation is 431 m.

References

Municipalities in São Paulo (state)